The Louisiana Tech Lady Techsters soccer team represents Louisiana Tech University in NCAA Division I college soccer. The team belongs to Conference USA (C-USA) and plays its home games at Robert Mack Caruthers Field. The Lady Techsters are currently led by Steve Voltz, who has been the head coach since 2021.

History 
On May 2, 2004, Jennifer Soileau was named the first head coach of the Lady Techsters soccer team. In their first season, the Lady Techsters went 0-10-2. Soileau went on to coach the Techsters for the 2005 and 2006 seasons, compiling a 11-30-5 overall record as the Lady Techsters head coach.

In 2007, Kevin Sherry was named head soccer coach at Louisiana Tech. During his tenure, the Lady Techsters have compiled a record of 107-75-21.

In 2008, the National Collegiate Athletic Association (NCAA) named the Louisiana Tech women's soccer team the most improved team in the nation across all NCAA sports.

The Lady Techsters are 118-105-26 all-time and 20-18-22 in Conference USA play.

Facilities
During the program's inaugural season in 2004, the team played all of their home games on the intramural soccer field across from the Lambright Intramural Center.

The Lady Techsters played in Joe Aillet Stadium, home to Louisiana Tech Bulldogs football team, for the 2005, 2006 and 2007 seasons.

In 2008, the Lady Techster Soccer Complex opened as the new home to the Lady Techster Soccer team. The complex played host to the 2010 Western Athletic Conference women's soccer tournament. The Lady Techsters all-time record at the Complex is 67-20-7.

On April 25, 2019, a powerful tornado came through Louisiana Tech's Campus destroying many athletics facilities, including the Lady Techsters Soccer Complex. In October 2019, the university announced that two alumni had donated $250,000 in honor of former Petroleum Engineering professor Dr. Robert Caruthers to assist in rebuilding the Lady Techster soccer complex. Caruthers was a long-time engineering professor at Tech, leading the university's program in Petroleum Engineering and Geosciences. After serving Tech students for nearly 30 years, from 1967 to 1995, he died October 3, 2016. Demolition of the damaged Lady Techsters Soccer Complex began in September 2019.

On November 21, 2019, the university announced plans to build new, integrated softball and women's soccer facilities to replaced fields and infrastructure destroyed by the April 2019 tornado. The new soccer facilities are expected to be completed before the Lady Techster's Fall 2020 season begins.

Seasons

Attendance

Awards

Team awards

Individual awards

Notable players

References

External links

Louisiana Tech University
2004 establishments in Louisiana
Association football clubs established in 2004